Aigurande is a commune in the Indre department in central France.

History
The town's name derives from the Gallic word Equoranda, which refers to a river or stream separating two Gallic tribes (in this case the Pictones (of Poitou) and the Bituriges (of the Berry).

Geography
The river Bouzanne has its source in the commune.

Population

See also
Saint-Benoît-du-Sault
Communes of the Indre department

References

Communes of Indre
Berry, France